Stephen Thomas Sedgwick,  (born 8 February 1950) is a retired senior Australian public servant. He is best known for his time as Australian Public Service Commissioner between 2009 and 2014, and for his prior appointments as secretary of various departments in the Australian Public Service.

Life and career
Steve Sedgwick was born on 8 February 1950.

In 1985, Sedgwick was appointed as a senior economic advisor to Prime Minister Bob Hawke. In September 1988, Sedgwick resigned from the role and took up a position as a Deputy Secretary of the Department of Finance.

He was appointed as Secretary of the Department of Finance in February 1992, after having acted in the role since January 1992. In 1997, he moved from the finance department to the secretary heading the Department of Employment, Education, Training and Youth Affairs (later Department of Education, Training and Youth Affairs and then Department of Education, Science and Training).

Between 2002 and 2007, Sedgwick was a Director, nominated by the Australian Government, on the board of directors of the Asian Development Bank based in Manila.

In December 2009, on the recommendation of the Rudd Government, Sedgwick was appointed Australian Public Service Commissioner. He finished his term on 13 December 2014.

Sedgwick is a member of the Jawun board.

In April 2016 Sedgwick was commissioned to conduct a review into bankers' pay and commissions; and recommended the termination of bonus payments to retail bank employees that are linked to sales performance.

Awards
In 2001, Sedgwick received a Centenary Medal for service to Australian society through public service leadership.
Sedgwick was made an Officer of the Order of Australia in June 2012.

Notes

References and further reading

1950 births
Living people
Australian public servants
Officers of the Order of Australia
Recipients of the Centenary Medal
Secretaries of the Australian Government Education Department
University of Sydney alumni
Secretaries of the Australian Department of Finance